Limarev is a rural locality (a khutor) in Maryevskoye Rural Settlement, Olkhovatsky District, Voronezh Oblast, Russia. The population was 219 as of 2010. There are 2 streets.

Geography 
Limarev is located 26 km northwest of Olkhovatka (the district's administrative centre) by road. Kravtsovka is the nearest rural locality.

References 

Rural localities in Olkhovatsky District